João Ricardo Vieira (born July 28, 1984, in Itatinga, São Paulo, Brazil), is a Brazilian professional rodeo cowboy who specializes in bull riding. Since 2013, he has been a top contestant on the Professional Bull Riders (PBR) circuit, qualifying for the PBR World Finals every year since then.

Career
Vieira was the 2013 PBR Rookie of the Year.  He is featured in the Netflix six-part docuseries Fearless on Brazilian professional bull riders.  He won the bull riding title at the 2019 and 2020 editions of The American Rodeo at AT&T Stadium in Arlington, Texas.  In 2020, he won the Monster Energy Buck Off at the Garden at Madison Square Garden and rose to the #1 PBR ranking in the world for a second time, the first being in 2015. This occasion also marked the first time the new trophy for this event, a miniature replica of Arturo Di Modica's Charging Bull sculpture, was presented to the winning rider at the event. Vieira was second in the PBR world  standings heading into the 2020 PBR World Finals. A few days before the start of the event, Vieira posted a video to his Facebook and Instagram account saying that he had tested positive for COVID-19, and as a result would not be able to compete at the World Finals. He still ended up finishing 2nd in the PBR world standings that year. 

The day after the conclusion of the 2022 PBR World Finals, the inaugural PBR Team Series season draft was held at Texas Live! in Arlington, Texas. Vieira was selected to ride for the Texas Rattlers. In late September 2022, the Texas Rattlers won the event at Thunder Days in Ridgedale, Missouri; the hometown event of rival team, the Missouri Thunder. Two weeks later, the Rattlers won their own hometown event at Rattler Days in Fort Worth, Texas. The very next weekend, the Rattlers won their third event in a row at Ridge Rider Days in Glendale, Arizona; the hometown event of rival team, the Arizona Ridge Riders. The Rattlers ended up finishing in third place at the conclusion of the inaugural PBR Team Series season.

References 

Bull riders
Brazilian sportspeople
Living people
1984 births